Shirli-myrli (also released as What a Mess!) is a 1995 farce comedy film of the early post-soviet era directed by Vladimir Menshov. Centered around a pursued con man, who stole a huge diamond, the movie, among other things, satirizes chauvinism, antisemitism and other ethnic tensions in the 1990s Russia. Valery Garkalin plays multiple roles as identical twins who were raised believing they belong to different cultures and races and used to look down on each other's.

Plot summary
While digging in the diamond mine "Unpromising" in Yakutia an enormous diamond was found. It is called The Savior of Russia: officials declare that the sale of the diamond could pay off the national debt and pay for every Russian citizen to take a three-year-long vacation at the Canary Islands.

While the diamond is being transported to Moscow (by Antonov An-124 Ruslan) it is stolen by the crime boss Kozulskiy (Armen Dzhigarkhanyan), who is then robbed by professional thief Vasiliy Krolikov (Valeri Garkalin).

For the remainder of the film, the plot revolves around Krolikov, a con man raised as a Russian and his two other identical multiple birth brothers, one was raised as a Jew to become a world famous musician, another as a Russian Roma to become a  chief and a deputy of the parliament. Krolikov is pursued by Kozulskiy's mafia and two militsiya officers - Jean-Paul Piskunov (Igor Ugolnikov) and an unnamed lieutenant (Sergey Batalov). At the end of the film it turns out that there is a fourth brother, raised as an African American, making all characters played by Garkalin at least quadruplets.

Cast
 Valery Garkalin as Vasily Krolikov, Innokentiy Shniperson, Roman Almazov and Patrick Crolikow
 Vera Alentova as Carol Abzats, Zemfira Almazova, Lusiena Krolikova and Whitney Crolikow
 Inna Churikova as Praskoviya Alekseyevna Krolikova
 Igor Ugolnikov as Jean-Paul Nikolayevich Piskunov
 Leonid Kuravlyov as US Ambassador to Russia
 Lyubov Polishchuk as Jennifer, Ambassador's wife
 Aleksandr Pankratov-Chyorny as Ambassador's bodyguard
 Mikhail Kokshenov as Ambassador's bodyguard
 Valeri Afanasyev as Anatoly Ivanov
 Yevgeni Aleksandrov as TV journalist
 Nina Alisova as music-lover
 Irina Apeksimova as Step performer and the Violinist from Conservatory
 Sergei Artsybashev as Registry Office Worker
 Sergey Batalov as Detective
 Lev Borisov as Mafioso
 Aleksei Buldakov as commander of the An-124 crew
 Yelena Bushuyeva
 Rolan Bykov as Head of Mafia and the Brilliant's buyer
 Yuri Chernov as Suitcase carrier
 Armen Dzhigarkhanyan as Kozyulski
 Sergei Gabrielyan as Ravil Beliletdinov
 Yevgeni Gerchakov as Symphony Orchestra Conductor
 Maksim Glotov as Police Officer
 Marina Golub as Director of the Philharmonic
 Vladimir Gusev as General
 Arkadi Koval as TV Announcer
 Tatyana Kravchenko as Bronislava Rosembaum, geologist
 Yuriy Kuzmenkov as Man with a goat
 Anatoly Kuznetsov as Father
 Vladimir Menshov as Russian President / Commentator on TV
 Pyotr Merkuryev as Meloman
 Nonna Mordyukova as Registry Office Worker
 Valeri Nikolayev as Step performer
 Vsevolod Sanayev
 Boris Smorchkov as General
 Oleg Tabakov as Sukhodrishchev
 Yevgeni Vesnik as Doctor
 Aleksandr Voroshilo as Spectator
 Oleg Yefremov as Neighbour

References

External links

Russian comedy films
1995 comedy films
1995 films
Films directed by Vladimir Menshov